Samuel Truett Cathy (March 14, 1921  September 8, 2014) was an American businessman, investor, author, and philanthropist. He founded the fast food restaurant chain Chick-fil-A in 1946.

Early life
Cathy was born on March 14, 1921, in Eatonton, Georgia, the son of Lilla James (née Kimball) and Joseph Benjamin Cathy. He attended Boys High School (renamed Henry W. Grady High School in 1947 and Midtown High School in 2020) in Atlanta and later served in the United States Army during World War II. Cathy began the Chick-fil-A restaurant chain in the Atlanta suburb of Hapeville in 1946 with a restaurant called the Dwarf Grill, whose name arose because of its small size. It was there that he, along with his brother and business partner Ben, created the chicken sandwich that later became the signature menu item for Chick-fil-A. The original restaurant (since renamed Dwarf House) is still in operation, and the company operates other Dwarf House locations in the metro Atlanta area. He married Jeannette McNeil, and they had three children: Trudy, Don "Bubba", and Dan.

Career
Cathy was a member of the Second Baptist Church in Jonesboro, Georgia, and taught Sunday School there for more than 50 years. He said that the Bible is his guidebook for life. Due to his strong religious beliefs, all of the company's locations, whether company-owned or franchised, are closed on Sundays to allow its employees to attend church and spend time with their families. This policy began when Cathy was working six days a week, multiple shifts. He decided to close on Sundays.

Cathy wrote five books: the autobiography Eat Mor Chikin: Inspire More People, a motivational book entitled It's Easier to Succeed Than to Fail, the parenting book It's Better to Build Boys Than Mend Men, an explanation of his business success in How Did You Do It, Truett?, and a final book on the significance of money in today's society titled Wealth, Is It Worth It?. He also contributed to the anthologies What My Parents Did Right and Conversations on Success, and co-wrote with Ken Blanchard Generosity Factor: Discover the Joy of Giving Your Time, Talent, and Treasure. McDonough-Fayetteville Road in Fayette, Henry, and Clayton counties, is named in his honor. Cathy said that the motivational book Think and Grow Rich by Napoleon Hill was one of the greatest foundations for inspiration growing up.

In April 2008, he opened Upscale Pizza in Fayetteville, Georgia. In November 2013, he retired as both chairman and CEO of Chick-fil-A, leaving his son, Dan Cathy, to assume the roles.

Death
S. Truett Cathy died at his home on September 8, 2014, of diabetic complications at the age of 93. The family held a public funeral service on Wednesday, September 10, at First Baptist Church, Jonesboro, Georgia. His interment was at Greenwood Cemetery.

His widow, Jeannette Cathy, died in 2015 at age 92.

Philanthropy
Cathy was closely involved with the sponsorship of the college football bowl game now known as the Chick-fil-A Bowl, but from 1997 to 2005 known as the Chick-fil-A Peach Bowl, and prior to that simply as the Peach Bowl. On October 28, 2006, Cathy received the last Taurus off the assembly line of Ford's Atlanta plant, in recognition of a 60-year relationship between him and the plant. The plant, located near Cathy's original Dwarf Grill (now Dwarf House), opened one year after the restaurant opened, and Truett regularly served during all three shifts at the plant. 

Cathy had a Leadership Scholarship program for Chick-fil-A restaurant employees, which has awarded more than $23 million in $1,000 scholarships in the past 35 years. In 1984, Cathy established the WinShape Foundation, named for its mission to shape winners. In addition, Cathy fostered children for more than 30 years. He received the William E. Simon Prize for Philanthropic Leadership in 2008.

Honors and memberships

Cathy received numerous honors, including membership in Omicron Delta Kappa (ΟΔΚ), the National Leadership Honor Society. He received ΟΔΚ's highest award, the Laurel Crowned Circle Award in 2009. He also received the Norman Vincent and Ruth Stafford Peale Humanitarian Award, the Horatio Alger Award, the William E. Simon Prize for Philanthropic Leadership, and the Boy Scouts of America Silver Buffalo Award. Cathy was inducted into the Junior Achievement U.S. Business Hall of Fame in 2003.

He was a member of Pi Kappa Alpha and Delta Sigma Pi Fraternities.

In 2007, Forbes magazine ranked Cathy as the 380th richest man in America and the 799th richest man in the world, with an estimated net worth of $1.2 billion.

President George W. Bush bestowed the President's Call to Service Award on Cathy in 2008.

Cathy was inducted into the Indiana Wesleyan University Society of World Changers on April 3, 2011. In addition to being inducted into the Society, the university conferred upon Cathy an honorary doctorate of business. In May 2012, Cathy received an honorary doctorate along with presidential candidate Mitt Romney at the Liberty University's spring commencement ceremony. In his remarks, Romney, the presumptive Republican presidential nominee at the time, said, "The Romney campaign comes to a sudden stop when we spot a Chick-fil-A. Your chicken sandwiches were our comfort food through the primary season, and heaven knows there were days that we needed a lot of comfort." Romney congratulated Cathy on his "well-deserved honor today".

In 1997, he received an honorary degree in Doctor of Humane Letters from Oglethorpe University.

In 2013, he was inducted as a Georgia Trustee. The honor is given by the Georgia Historical Society, in conjunction with the Governor of Georgia, to individuals whose accomplishments and community service reflect the ideals of the founding body of Trustees, which governed the Georgia colony from 1732 to 1752.

Publications

References

External links
 Horatio Alger Association of Distinguished Americans: S. Truett Cathy; accessed September 8, 2014.
Serving with a Smile: Meet S. Truett Cathy, Winner of the 2008 William E. Simon Prize for Philanthropic Leadership 

1921 births
2014 deaths
American billionaires
American business writers
American investors
United States Army personnel of World War II
American motivational writers
Philanthropists from Georgia (U.S. state)
American restaurateurs
Baptists from Georgia (U.S. state)
Businesspeople from Georgia (U.S. state)
Cathy family
Chick-fil-A
Fast-food chain founders
Georgia (U.S. state) Republicans
Military personnel from Georgia (U.S. state)
People from Eatonton, Georgia
People from Hapeville, Georgia
People from Jonesboro, Georgia
Southern Baptists
United States Army soldiers
Writers from Georgia (U.S. state)